Nurimanovsky District (Nuriman rayonı) is an administrative and municipal district (raion), one of the fifty-four in the Republic of Bashkortostan, Russia. It is located in the northeast of the republic and borders with Karaidelsky District in the north, Chelyabinsk Oblast in the east, Iglinsky District in the south, and with Blagoveshchensky District in the west. Its administrative center is the rural locality (a selo) of Krasnaya Gorka. As of the 2010 Census, the total population of the district was 20,824, with the population of Krasnaya Gorka accounting for 20.6% of that number.

History
The district was established in 1930.

Administrative and municipal status
Within the framework of administrative divisions, Nurimanovsky District is one of the fifty-four in the Republic of Bashkortostan. The district is divided into twelve selsoviets, comprising fifty-one rural localities. As a municipal division, the district is incorporated as Nurimanovsky Municipal District. Its twelve selsoviets are incorporated as twelve rural settlements within the municipal district. The selo of Krasnaya Gorka serves as the administrative center of both the administrative and municipal district.

References

Notes

Sources

Districts of Bashkortostan
States and territories established in 1930